Dr. Krisztina Dobos (July 18, 1949 – December 12, 2013) was a Hungarian educator, economist and politician, member of the National Assembly (MP) from Budapest Regional List then the National List of the Hungarian Democratic Forum (MDF) between 1993 and 1998.

She served as Deputy Secretary of State for Education in the Cabinet of Prime Minister József Antall between 1991 and 1993. She became MP on September 13, 1993, replacing György Sándorfy, who died on July 6, 1993. She was a member of the Committee on Education, Science, Youth and Sports from 1994 to 1998.

Krisztina Dobos died on December 12, 2013, aged 64, in Budapest.

References

1949 births
2013 deaths
Hungarian educators
Hungarian women educators
Hungarian economists
Hungarian Democratic Forum politicians
Women members of the National Assembly of Hungary
Members of the National Assembly of Hungary (1990–1994)
Members of the National Assembly of Hungary (1994–1998)
Politicians from Budapest
20th-century Hungarian women politicians